The Homeland Party or Libyan National Party (also styled Alwattan Party,   or ) is a conservative Islamist political party in Libya, founded in November 2011, after the Libyan Civil War and the overthrow of the Libyan Arab Jamahiriya. It is endorsed and led by Ali al-Sallabi, an influential Salafist cleric. Members include also Abdelhakim Belhadj, Mahmoud Hamza, Ali Zeidan and Mansour Saif Al-Nasar. At the time of its establishment, it had the provisional name of National Gathering for Freedom, Justice and Development.

Al-Sallabi has strong ties to both Yusuf al-Qaradawi, spiritual leader of the international Muslim Brotherhood, and Abdelhakim Belhadj, former "emir" of the Libyan Islamic Fighting Group. The party calls for "moderate" Islamic democracy, but demands to base a new Libyan constitution on Sharia law.

The Arabic word waṭan can be translated as "nation" or "homeland". The party claims to have offices in 27 Libyan cities.  Regardless, the party won no seats in the Libyan General National Congress election of 2012.

See also
Justice and Development Party, a rival Islamist Libyan party.

External links
Official website  (Arabic)
 Official Alwattan Party website (auto-translated to English).

References

2011 establishments in Libya
Islamic democratic political parties
Islamic political parties in Libya
Islamism in Libya
Political parties established in 2011
Political parties in Libya
Sunni Islamic political parties
Muslim Brotherhood